South View High School is a 9–12 public high school in Hope Mills, North Carolina, United States. It is a member of Cumberland County Schools (CSS). Adjacent to South View High School is South View Middle School. Enrollment of students is approximately 1900, placing the school under the NCHSAA 4A classification.

Academic programs 
Academic programs in the school include the International Baccalaureate Academy and the Academy of Public Safety and Security. The principal is Tonjai Robertson as of 2017.

Athletics 
 Basketball
 Wrestling
 Football
 Soccer
 Volleyball
 Baseball
 Golf
 Softball
 Track and field
 Swimming

Notable alumni 
 Garry Battle, Arena Football League player
 Jeff Capel, former basketball player at Duke University and now college coach
 Antonio Dingle, professional American football player
 Charles Kirby, National Football League player

References

External links 
 

Public high schools in North Carolina
Schools in Cumberland County, North Carolina